Freehold may refer to:

In real estate
Freehold (law), the tenure of property in fee simple
Customary freehold, a form of feudal tenure of land in England
Parson's freehold, where a Church of England rector or vicar of holds title to benefice property

Places
Freehold, Greater Manchester, an area of Oldham, in North West England
Freehold Metrolink station, a light rail stop in Greater Manchester, England
Freehold, a Victorian terraced area in the north east of Lancaster, Lancashire, England
Freehold Borough, New Jersey, United States
Freehold Township, New Jersey, United States
Freehold, New York, United States
Freehold Township, Warren County, Pennsylvania, United States

In fiction
Farnham's Freehold, 1965 science fiction novel by Robert A. Heinlein
Freehold (novel), 2004 science fiction novel by Michael Z. Williamson

Other
, a United States Navy minesweeper and tug in commission from 1917 to 1919
Freehold Stakes, an American Thoroughbred horse race
 Freehold, Iowa, fictional town